The Patagon language might be:
Tehuelche language, of Argentina
Patagon language (Peru)